Olga (?-990), was a Grand Princess of the Kiev by marriage to Vladimir the Great, Grand Prince of Kiev (r. 980–1015).

Issue
 Vysheslav (c. 977c. 1010), Prince of Novgorod (988–1010)

References

Year of birth unknown
Date of death unknown
Kievan Rus' princesses
10th-century Rus' women